The Raigam Tele'es Most Popular Teledrama Series Award is presented annually in Sri Lanka by the Kingdom of Raigam for the most popular Sri Lankan teledrama series of the year on television.

The award was first given in 2007. Following is a list of the winners of this prestigious title since 2007.

Award list in each year

References

Raigam Tele'es